Dyscritogyne is a genus of Mexican flowering plants in the family Asteraceae.

 Species
 Dyscritogyne adenosperma (Sch.Bip.) R.M.King & H.Rob. - Morelos, Nayarit, Durango, Jalisco, Guerrero, México State, Zacatecas, Michoacán
 Dyscritogyne dryophila (B.L.Rob.) R.M.King & H.Rob. - Nayarit,  Zacatecas, Jalisco, 	Sinaloa

References

Eupatorieae
Endemic flora of Mexico
Asteraceae genera